The 2007 Oceania Handball Nations Cup was the third edition of the Oceania Handball Nations Cup, held from 5 to 6 June 2007, in Sydney, Australia. The winner qualified for the 2007 World Women's Handball Championship.

Australia and New Zealand played a four-game series to determine the winner. New Zealand played with two teams. This was a part of a Handball exhibition tournament at State Sports Centre, Sydney.

Overview

All times are local (UTC+10).

Games

References

External links
Official website (archived)
Oceania Continent Handball Federation webpage

Oceania Women's Handball Nations Cup
2007 Women's Oceania Handball Championship
Oceania Handball Championship
Women's handball in Australia
2007 in Australian sport
June 2007 sports events in Australia